500 Boylston Street is a 1.3-million square foot postmodern building located in the Back Bay section of Boston and part of the city's High Spine, completed in 1989. It sits next to the landmark Trinity Church, Boston. It dominates the western half of the city block bounded by Boylston, Clarendon and Berkeley streets and St. James Avenue. The building was designed by John Burgee Architects with Philip Johnson, with structural engineering by LeMessurier Consultants and MEP/FP engineering by Cosentini Associates, Inc. The construction project was managed by Bond Brothers. It cost $100 million to build.

The first six floors are  retail and small office space. Above that there is a 19-story office tower with Class A office space. It has an underground parking lot for 1,000 cars that it shares with 222 Berkeley Street.

Material
The structural design is made up of composite beams and girders supporting steel deck and concrete topping slab on a steel frame. The parking garage is made up of slurry wall construction.

The building's distinctive design includes carved rose granite cladding with two-story windows, a vaulted copper roof line, and strong exterior column detailing. The design, by John Burgee Architects with Philip Johnson as Design Consultant, also includes a main building entrance through a courtyard, framed on each side by two symmetrical wings, each faced with soaring columns.

Awards
 Building Owners and Managers Association (BOMA) Building of the Year Award, 2005
 EPA's Sustained Excellence in Energy Management award, 2004
 Building Owners and Managers Association (BOMA) Building of the Year Award, 2001
 ENERGY STAR certification label, 2000
 Building Owners and Managers Association (BOMA) Building of the Year Award, 1996

Television 

500 Boylston Street is seen on the television show Boston Legal. The fictional law firm Crane, Poole & Schmidt's Boston office is located on the building's 14th, 15th and a fictional 28th floor due to the building only having 25 floors. There are also no balconies attached to these floors where Boston Legal was set.

References

External links
 Entry on SkyscraperPage
 Entry on Emporis

Office buildings completed in 1989
Skyscraper office buildings in Boston
John Burgee buildings
Back Bay, Boston
Philip Johnson buildings